Davide Giannoni is an Italian professional vert skater. Giannoni started skating when he was 21 in 1999 and turned professional in 2010. Giannoni has attended many competitions in his vert skating career.

Best Tricks McTwist 720 & Mc Twist 540

Competitions 
Lousanne contest 2002- 5th position
Lousanne contest 2003- 5th position
Festival of fitness 2006- 1st position
E.C. Championship 2009 Sofia stop- 12th position
E.C. championship 2009 final contest- 10th position
King of Diga Contest 2009- 1st position
2010 I became a part of the European circuit vert E.C. Championship 2010
Gladiator Contest 2010 (France) - 4th position pro
King of Ramps 2010 - 3rd position pro
E.C. Championship Moscow (Russia) stop - 11th position pro
E.C. Championship Montana (Bulgaria) stop - 14th position
E.C. Championship Mallorca (Spain) Surf Action- 7th position
E.C. Championship Final Berlin (Germany) - 7th position pro
Championship Ranking 10th position
Drino invitational mini ramp contest - 2nd position pro 2011
N.L. 5 contest 4th position pro
King of the Ramp 2011 2nd position
E.C. Championship Rotterdam (Netherlands) stop- 6th position
King of Warriors 2011 Barcelona (Spain) - 6th position
E.C. Championship Moscow (Russia) stop - 5th position
2011 Championship Ranking 6th position
Gladiator Contest 2012 - 2nd position
Chewits Xtreme contest Birmingham (United Kingdom) - 3rd position
Moscow City Games - 7th position
E.C. Championship Copenaghen stop - 6th position
King of Warriors contest (Spain) - 3rd position
GladiatorContest, Nantes (France), 4th
NLContest, Strasbourg (France), 9th
Kia World Extreme Games, Shanghai (China), 9th
FardamattiVertInvitational (San Marino), 3rd
International Roller Cup, Modena (Ita), 6th
European Championship Halfpipe Final, Bosh (Netherlands), 6th
NLContest, Strasburg 2014 (France) 6th
Fardamatti Vert Invitational 2014 (San Marino),2nd
Woodward California Camp
Fardamatti Tour 2014

References

External links
teamdunlop.hookit.com
rollernews.com
chewitsxtreme.co.uk
kingeventi.com
kingeventi.com
toxboe.net
kingeventi.com
toxboe.net

1978 births
Living people
Vert skaters
X Games athletes